Smiljan Rozman (28 January 1927 – 15 March 2007) was a Slovene writer, author of numerous novels and collections of short stories who also wrote for young readers and scripts for children's programmes and drama series on television.

Rozman was born in Celje in 1927. Soon after his birth the family moved to Maribor where he grew up. During the Second World War sent on forced labour to Germany and France. After the war he worked as a factory worker, musician, painter, actor and teacher and eventually a full-time writer. He died in Ljubljana in 2007.

In 1965 he won the Prešeren Foundation Award for his novel Druščina (The Company). In 1968 he won the Levstik Award for his book Reporter Tejč poroča (Tejč the Reporter Reports).

Published works

 Adult Prose
Nekdo (Someone), novel, 1958
Obala (The Coast), novel, 1959
Mesto (The Town), short stories, 1961
Na tekočem traku (On the Conveyor Belt), comic stories, 1962
Rozalija (Rozalia), novel, 1963
Vrtačnik, novel, 1963
Druščina (The Company), novel, 1965
Ruševine (The Ruin), novel, 1965
Brusač (The Grinder), novel, 1965
Poletje (The Summer), novel, 1966
Pokopališče (The Graveyard), novel, 1968
Leta in dnevi (Years and Days), short stories, 1972
Leteči krožnik (The Flying Saucer), novel, 1976

 For Children and Young Adults
Teden ima sedem dni (The Week Has Seven Days), 1962
Čudežni pisalni strojček (The Magic Typewriter), 1966
Reporter Tejč poroča (Tejč the Reporter Reports), 1968
Janko in njegov svet (Janko and His World), 1969
Lov za ukradenimi milijoni (Hunting the Stolen Millions), 1969
Tri zgodbe (Three Stories), 1970
Zlata trobenta (The Golden Trumpet), 1971
Sin Martin (The Son Martin), 1974
Martin fantalin (The Boy Martin), 1976
Majhne besede, velike reči (Small Words, Large Things), 1976
Oblaček Pohajaček (Wanderer the Cloud), 1978
Poklici (Occupations), 1978
Fantje muzikantje (The Musical Lads), 1979
Ta glavna Urša (Ursulla the Leader), 1981
Mezinček in Mezinčica (Tom Thumb and Thumbelina), 1983
Klip, klap in deček Mak (Clip, Clap and the Boy Mak), 1999
Koza Filomena (Philomena the Goat), 1999
Pes Pip (Pip the Dog), 1999

References

Writers from Celje
Slovenian children's writers
1927 births
2007 deaths
Levstik Award laureates
Forced labourers under German rule during World War II